Fatih Atik (born 25 February 1984) is a French professional footballer. He most recently played as a midfielder for the Turkish TFF First League side Giresunspor.

Career
On 16 April 2014, Atik scored an extra-time goal in the semi-final which helped Guingamp to a shock 3–1 in over Monaco and advance to the 2014 Coupe de France Final, which they went on to win, with him playing the last six minutes against Rennes as a substitute for Claudio Beauvue. His equaliser, in a league match against Monaco on 7 May, handed the Ligue 1 title to Paris Saint-Germain.

Honours
Guingamp
 Coupe de France: 2013–14

References

External links
 

1984 births
Living people
People from Gleizé
Association football midfielders
French footballers
French people of Turkish descent
Turkish footballers
Montpellier HSC players
Tours FC players
US Boulogne players
En Avant Guingamp players
Trabzonspor footballers
Kardemir Karabükspor footballers
Giresunspor footballers
Ligue 1 players
Ligue 2 players
Süper Lig players
Sportspeople from Rhône (department)
Footballers from Auvergne-Rhône-Alpes